Wiremu "Bill" Whareaitu (15 August 1912 − 3 April 1973) was a New Zealand swimmer, who represented his country at the 1934 British Empire Games in London.

Whareaitu was the national 150 yards backstroke champion in 1934, and travelled to the Empire Games in London that year as part of the three-strong New Zealand swimming team. At those games he finished fourth in his heat of the 100 yards backstroke and did not progress. He reached the final of the 3 x 110 yards medley relay with teammates Noel Crump and Len Smith, finishing fifth.

Of Te Arawa and Tūhourangi descent, Whareaitu served with the 28th (Māori) Battalion during World War II, and competed in the battalion's team at the New Zealand Division swimming championships at Maadi, Egypt in September 1943. In May 1945 he was commissioned as a second lieutenant.

Whareaitu died in 1973 and was buried at Kauae Cemetery, Ngongotahā.

References

1912 births
1973 deaths
Te Arawa people
Tuhourangi people
New Zealand male backstroke swimmers
Commonwealth Games competitors for New Zealand
Swimmers at the 1934 British Empire Games
New Zealand Māori sportspeople
New Zealand military personnel of World War II
Burials at Kauae Cemetery
20th-century New Zealand people